União Desportiva de Leiria, commonly known as União de Leiria, is a Portuguese football club based in Leiria, central Portugal. Founded on 6 June 1966, it currently plays in the Campeonato de Portugal, holding home matches at Estádio Dr. Magalhães Pessoa, with a 24,000-seat capacity.

History
Leiria's biggest rivals in Portugal are S.C. Beira-Mar, Associação Naval 1º de Maio and Académica de Coimbra, which belong to the same geographical region. In 1979–80, the club first competed in the top division, finishing in 13th position and being the first team inside the relegation zone.

A heavy contender in the battle to reach European competitions in the 2000s, the club was relegated in 2007–08 to the second level, after finishing last. The team would be immediately promoted back, coming in second after champions S.C. Olhanense.

On 23 August 2004, União de Leiria reached the UEFA Intertoto Cup final with Lille. After getting a 0–0 in France in the first leg, the whole city thought it would be possible for the club to win a European competition. However, in the second leg, after another 0–0 draw at their home stadium, the team would lose the game in extra time by 0–2, mostly due to the excessive fatigue. For the history, it was the first Portuguese team to reach the final of this competition.

The 2011–12 season was lived amongst serious financial difficulties, with the squad not being paid their wages for several months, as three coaching moves also happened during the campaign and president João Bartolomeu resigned amongst accusations of ingratitude towards the players. On 29 April 2012, after most of the squad rescinded their contracts, only eight players took the pitch for the league match at home against C.D. Feirense in an eventual 0–4 home loss. Curiously, one of those players was the well-known goalkeeper Jan Oblak. The side played the last two matches, against S.L. Benfica and C.D. Nacional, with a complete team, but three players came from the juniors.

After failing to meet the deadline to register the team in Division Two, Leiria were automatically relegated to the third level. Overwhelmed with the task of rebuilding a squad from scratch, the organization hired several players in an attempt to return to the professionals, as a second senior team also begun competing in the Leiria regional leagues, coached by former club player Luís Bilro.
On 28 June 2013, the UD Leiria SAD was declared bankrupt in a meeting of creditors, which demanded the payment of a debt amounting to €13.5 million, with the Portuguese state abstaining for demanding a debt of over €3.6 million. The second senior team that competed in the regional league took the place of the SAD by buying their sports rights for €1,000, with the club returning to the Estádio Dr. Magalhães Pessoa after playing their home matches at other grounds for two seasons.

In February 2015, at an extraordinary general assembly, UD Leiria would vote for the creation of another SAD, opening doors to the arrival of Alexander Tolstikov, who after João Bartolomeu would become the new "Lord" of Leiria. The club would have already had a SAD between 1999 and 2013, having been extinguished in the face of its high debt value. The SAD's initial share capital is 40% owned by UD Leiria and 60% owned by DS Investment LLP, of which Alexander Tolstikov is one of those responsible. Thus, DS Investment started to control the main Football team and also the junior team.

Currently, the club is competing in the Liga 3 (National Third Division).

Current squad

League and cup history
{|class="wikitable"
|-bgcolor="#efefef"
! Season
!
! Pos.
! Pl.
! W
! D
! L
! GS
! GA
! P
!Cup
!colspan=2|Europe
!Notes
|-
|1970–71
|2DN
|align=right |3
|align=right|26||align=right|11||align=right|8||align=right|7
|align=right|40||align=right|34||align=right|30
||
|
|
|
|-
|1971–72
|2DS
|align=right |3
|align=right|30||align=right|14||align=right|7||align=right|9
|align=right|50||align=right|29||align=right|35
||
|
|
|
|-
|1972–73
|2DS
|align=right |5
|align=right|30||align=right|17||align=right|5||align=right|8
|align=right|50||align=right|27||align=right|39
||
|
|
|
|-
|1973–74
|2DS
|align=right |7
|align=right|38||align=right|16||align=right|9||align=right|13
|align=right|52||align=right|49||align=right|41
||
|
|
|
|-
|1974–75
|2DS
|align=right |13
|align=right|38||align=right|12||align=right|10||align=right|16
|align=right|50||align=right|56||align=right|34
||
|
|
|
|-
|1975–76
|2DS
|align=right |17
|align=right|38||align=right|11||align=right|12||align=right|15
|align=right|42||align=right|52||align=right|34
||
|
|
|
|-
|1976–77
|2DC
|align=right |11
|align=right|30||align=right|10||align=right|8||align=right|12
|align=right|26||align=right|31||align=right|28
||
|
|
|
|-
|1977–78
|2DC
|align=right |8
|align=right|30||align=right|11||align=right|8||align=right|11
|align=right|34||align=right|42||align=right|30
||
|
|
|
|-
|1978–79
|2DC
|align=right bgcolor=gold|1
|align=right|30||align=right|20||align=right|6||align=right|4
|align=right|56||align=right|20||align=right|46
||
|
|
|Promoted
|-
|1979–80 
|1D
|align=right |13
|align=right|30||align=right|6||align=right|9||align=right|15
|align=right|26||align=right|49||align=right|21
||
|
|
|Relegated
|-
|1980–81
|2DC
|align=right bgcolor=gold|1
|align=right|30||align=right|19||align=right|7||align=right|4
|align=right|56||align=right|21||align=right|45
||
|
|
|Promoted
|-
|1981–82
|1D
|align=right |16
|align=right|30||align=right|8||align=right|4||align=right|18
|align=right|25||align=right|50||align=right|20
||
|
|
|Promoted

|-
|1982–83
|2DC
|align=right |3
|align=right|30||align=right|17||align=right|10||align=right|3
|align=right|44||align=right|17||align=right|44
||
|
|
|
|-
|1983–84
|2DC
|align=right |9
|align=right|30||align=right|10||align=right|8||align=right|12
|align=right|35||align=right|25||align=right|28
||
|
|
|
|-
|1984–85
|2DC
|align=right bgcolor=silver|2
|align=right|30||align=right|17||align=right|7||align=right|6
|align=right|42||align=right|27||align=right|41
||
|
|
|
|-
|1985–86
|2DC
|align=right |9
|align=right|30||align=right|10||align=right|8||align=right|12
|align=right|33||align=right|49||align=right|28
||
|
|
|
|-
|1986–87
|2DC
|align=right |12
|align=right|30||align=right|10||align=right|7||align=right|13
|align=right|28||align=right|40||align=right|27
||
|
|
|
|-
|1987–88
|2DC
|align=right |4
|align=right|38||align=right|18||align=right|11||align=right|9
|align=right|64||align=right|43||align=right|47
||
|
|
|
|-
|1988–89
|2DC
|align=right |10
|align=right|34||align=right|9||align=right|13||align=right|12
|align=right|42||align=right|44||align=right|31
||
|
|
|
|-
|1989–90
|2DC
|align=right |3
|align=right|34||align=right|20||align=right|9||align=right|5
|align=right|61||align=right|18||align=right|49
||
|
|
|
|-
|1990–91
|2H
|align=right |9
|align=right|38||align=right|14||align=right|13||align=right|11
|align=right|45||align=right|35||align=right|41
||
|
|
|
|-
|1991–92
|2H
|align=right |8
|align=right|34||align=right|13||align=right|9||align=right|12
|align=right|34||align=right|32||align=right|35
||
|
|
|
|-
|1992–93
|2H
|align=right |8
|align=right|34||align=right|13||align=right|8||align=right|13
|align=right|36||align=right|37||align=right|34
||
|
|
|
|-
|1993–94
|2H
|align=right bgcolor=silver|2
|align=right|34||align=right|19||align=right|7||align=right|8
|align=right|46||align=right|19||align=right|45
||
|
|
|Promoted
|-
|1994–95
|1D
|align=right |6
|align=right|34||align=right|13||align=right|10||align=right|11
|align=right|41||align=right|44||align=right|36
||
|
|
|
|-
|1995–96
|1D
|align=right |7
|align=right|34||align=right|14||align=right|5||align=right|5
|align=right|38||align=right|50||align=right|47
||
|IC
|GS
|
|-
|1996–97
|1D
|align=right |17
|align=right|34||align=right|8||align=right|6||align=right|20
|align=right|25||align=right|53||align=right|30
||
|
|
|Relegated
|-
|1997–98
|2H
|align=right bgcolor=gold|1
|align=right|34||align=right|20||align=right|10||align=right|4
|align=right|73||align=right|32||align=right|70
||
|
|
|Promoted
|-
|1998–99
|1D
|align=right |6
|align=right|34||align=right|14||align=right|10||align=right|10
|align=right|36||align=right|29||align=right|52
||last 16
|
|
|
|-
|1999–00
|1D
|align=right |10
|align=right|34||align=right|10||align=right|12||align=right|12
|align=right|31||align=right|35||align=right|42
||
|
|
|
|-
|2000–01
|1D
|align=right |5
|align=right|34||align=right|15||align=right|11||align=right|8
|align=right|46||align=right|41||align=right|56
||
|
|
|Best classification ever
|-
|2001–02
|1D
|align=right |7
|align=right|34||align=right|15||align=right|10||align=right|9
|align=right|52||align=right|35||align=right|55
||
|
|
|
|-
|2002–03
|1D
|align=right |5
|align=right|34||align=right|13||align=right|10||align=right|11
|align=right|49||align=right|47||align=right|49
|bgcolor=silver|final
|IC
|1st round
|
|-
|2003–04
|1D
|align=right |10
|align=right|34||align=right|11||align=right|12||align=right|11
|align=right|43||align=right|45||align=right|45
||last 16
|UC
|1st round
|
|-
|2004–05
|1D
|align=right |15
|align=right|34||align=right|8||align=right|14||align=right|12
|align=right|29||align=right|36||align=right|38
||last 32
|IC
|runner-up
|
|-
|2005–06
|1D
|align=right |7
|align=right|34||align=right|13||align=right|8||align=right|13
|align=right|44||align=right|42||align=right|47
||last 64
|IC
|3rd round
|
|-
|2006–07
|1D
|align=right |7
|align=right|30||align=right|10||align=right|11||align=right|9
|align=right|25||align=right|27||align=right|41
||last 32
|
|
|
|-
|2007–08
|1D
|align=right |16
|align=right|30||align=right|3||align=right|7||align=right|20
|align=right|25||align=right|53||align=right|16
||last 32
|ICUC
|Winner1st round
|Relegated
|-
|2008–09
|2H
|align=right bgcolor=silver|2
|align=right|28||align=right|15||align=right|9||align=right|6
|align=right|46||align=right|29||align=right|53
|last 64
|
|
|Promoted
|-
|2009–10
|1D
|align=right |9
|align=right|30||align=right|9||align=right|8||align=right|13
|align=right|35||align=right|41||align=right|35
||last 32
|
|
|
|-
|2010–11
|1D
|align=right |10
|align=right|30||align=right|9||align=right|8||align=right|13
|align=right|25||align=right|38||align=right|35
||last 64
|
|
|
|-
|2011–12
|1D
|align=right |16
|align=right|30||align=right|5||align=right|4||align=right|21
|align=right|25||align=right|56||align=right|19
||last 64
|
|
|Relegated
|-
|2012–13
|2DS
|align=right |7
|align=right|30||align=right|13||align=right|7||align=right|10
|align=right|36||align=right|31||align=right|46
||last 32
|
|
|
|-
|2013–14
|3
|align=right |3
|align=right|32||align=right|17||align=right|8||align=right|7
|align=right|43||align=right|33||align=right|24
||last 64
|
|
|
|-
|2014–15
|3
|align=right |3
|align=right|30||align=right|16||align=right|7||align=right|7
|align=right|57||align=right|35||align=right|39
||2nd rd
|
|
|
|}

Honours
Second Division: 1997–98
Third Division: 1980–81
UEFA Intertoto Cup co-winners: 2007
Taça de Portugal runners-up: 2002–03
Supertaça Cândido de Oliveira runners-up: 2003

Stadium

The Estádio Dr. Magalhães Pessoa was built for UEFA Euro 2004 in 2003, hosting during the competition Croatia's matches against Switzerland (0–0) and France (2–2). It also hosted the 2006 Supertaça Cândido de Oliveira final between FC Porto and Vitória de Setúbal, as well as the following (Sporting CP 1–0 Porto).

The architect who designed the stadium was Tomás Taveira, who also designed stadiums for Euro 2004, including Beira-Mar's Estádio Municipal de Aveiro and Sporting CP's Estádio José Alvalade. The grounds belong to the municipality of Leiria.

Due to an excessive rent, Leiria relocated to the Estádio Municipal in the nearby town of Marinha Grande, for 2011–12. For the following season, the club moved to Campo da Portela in Santa Catarina da Serra, home of U.D. Serra.

After the SAD bankruptcy, the club returned to play its home matches at the Estádio Dr. Magalhães Pessoa.

Managers

 Vieira Nunes (1989–90)
 Luís Campos (1992–93)
 Manuel Cajuda (1993–94)
 Vitor Manuel (1994–96)
 Eurico Gomes (1996)
 Quinito (1996–97)
 Vitor Manuel (1997)
 Vítor Oliveira (1997–98)
 Mário Reis (1998–99)
 Manuel José (1999–01)
 José Mourinho (2001–02)
 Mário Reis (2002)
 Vítor Pontes (2002)
 Manuel Cajuda (2002–03)
 Vítor Pontes (2003–05)
 José Manuel Gomes (2005)
 Jorge Jesus (2005–06)
 Domingos (2006–07)
 Paulo Duarte (2007)
 Vítor Oliveira (2007–08)
 Paulo Alves (2008)
 Manuel Fernandes (2008–09)
 Lito Vidigal (2009–10)
 Pedro Caixinha (2010–11)
 Vítor Pontes (2011)
 Manuel Cajuda (2011–12)
 José Dominguez (2012)
 Ricardo Moura (2012–2013)
 Luis Bilro (2012–2013)
 Rui Rodrigues (2013–2014)
 Jorge Casquilha (2014–2016)
 Siarhei Kabelski (2016)
 Kata (2016–2017)
 Serghei Cleșcenco (2017)
 Rui Amorim (2017–2018)
 Luís Pinto (2018)
 Tiago Vicente (2018)
 Filipe Cândido (2019–2020)
 Carlão (2020)
 Orlando (2020)

Fans
União's fans are called Leirienses, and their main group of supporters is Frente Leiria ("Leiria Front").

See also
Apito Dourado

References

External links
 
Zerozero team profile

 
Football clubs in Portugal
Association football clubs established in 1966
1966 establishments in Portugal
UD Leiria
Primeira Liga clubs
Liga Portugal 2 clubs